Dizangue is a village in the Littoral Province of Cameroon.

Personalities
Thomas Nkono, former football goalkeeper (1955)

See also
Communes of Cameroon

External links
Satellite map of Dizangue

Populated places in Littoral Region (Cameroon)